Donald Richard Spencer  (born 22 March 1941), is an Australian children's television presenter, singer-songwriter, and guitarist. He had a long-running role on Play School on both the Australian version (1968–99) and the United Kingdom version (1972–88), one of only two presenters to work on both versions.

In March 1963, his first single, "Fireball" – the theme tune to a UK TV science fiction series Fireball XL5 – reached No. 32 on the UK Singles Chart. In 2002, Spencer established the Australian Children's Music Foundation. On Australia Day (26 January) 2007, he was awarded a Medal of the Order of Australia (OAM) with the citation "for service to children's music and television as a songwriter and performer, and through the establishment of the Australian Children's Music Foundation". Spencer married Julie Horsfall, they have two children: Dean, a musician; and Danielle, an actress and singer, who was married to actor Russell Crowe between 2003 and 2018.

Early life
Donald Richard Spencer was born on 22 March 1941, the son of John Henry and Lillian May in Tamworth. Spencer attended Tamworth High School. He played hockey as a teenager and competed in the Australian championships. At 17, he left Australia and travelled to Africa, where, in his 20s, he trained with the Kenyan hockey team, trying out for the Olympics. A chance meeting with locally-born, singer-songwriter, Roger Whittaker, in Nairobi inspired Spencer to buy a guitar and start his musical career.

Career debut
In the early 1960s, Don Spencer moved to London and became a solo singer-guitarist, supporting various acts such as The Rolling Stones, the Four Seasons, The Hollies and Marianne Faithfull. His first single, "Fireball", was released on the His Master's Voice label; it was the closing theme song for the television science fiction series Fireball XL5, written by Barry Gray. In March 1963, it reached No. 32 on the UK Singles Chart. Other singles included "Busy Doing Nothing", "Worried Mind", "Marriage Is for Old Folks", and a cover of The Beatles' 1965 song "In My Life". In 1964, he covered Brent Edwards' version of Johnny Madara and David White's track "Pride Is Such a Little Word".

Spencer presented his own teenage pop show Gangway! for seven years; afterwards, he co-hosted Pop-In. He later appeared in TV comedies such as Face It with Ronnie Barker. Returning to Australia, he appeared on TV's Bandstand, and he has subsequently acted in Sons and Daughters, Return to Eden, and in the 1974 film Barry McKenzie Holds His Own. In 1977, Spencer wrote his next single, "What's a Pommie?"; the track was covered by fellow Australians Rolf Harris and Col Elliott.

Children's entertainment

In 1968, Spencer became a presenter on Australia children's TV series Play School. In 1972, he also appeared on the United Kingdom version of the same title. He continued on both versions for 17 years, the only male presenter to appear in both. One of his well-known phrases was "old magazines", which he used to effect when describing items used to make something. During this period, he recorded and released albums that helped to educate children, mostly about the many species of Australian animals, and they in turn have received awards for gold and platinum sales. He continued on the Australian version until 1999. At the APRA Music Awards of 1995, Spencer's track "Have a Beaut Day" was nominated for Most Performed Children's Work; it was co-written by Spencer with Allan Caswell.

In 2002, Spencer established the Australian Children's Music Foundation (ACMF) as its inaugural CEO. In 2007, he was awarded a Medal of the Order of Australia (OAM) on Australia Day (26 January) for "service to children's music and television as a songwriter and performer, and through the establishment of the Australian Children's Music Foundation". In 2008, Spencer was awarded for Excellence in Community Support presented by Support Act Limited.

In December 2010, the ACMF sponsored a supergroup, Peacebeliever, which recorded a cover version of Plastic Ono Band's 1969 single "Give Peace a Chance" for their charity. Alongside Spencer, fellow vocalists include Katie Noonan, Blue King Brown, Tim Freedman, Newton Faulkner, and Omara Portuondo. In July 2013, Spencer announced the ACMF's 11th annual National Kids Songwriting Competition, which is open to school-aged children from four to eighteen years old. Spencer said, "We want kids to unleash their creativity and engage with learning in a fun way ... Music can give kids really positive self expression and is a great tool for improving literacy levels".

Personal life

Don Spencer married Julie Horsfall, a caterer from Yorkshire. They have two children: Dean and Danielle Spencer (born 16 May 1969). Dean is a musician, while Danielle is an actress and singer, who was married to actor Russell Crowe from 2003 to 2018.

Spencer resides in Darlinghurst, New South Wales.

Discography

Albums

Charting singles

Other singles

TV and filmography
Bandstand – television series
Barry McKenzie Holds His Own (1974)
King's Men – television series (1976)
Sons and Daughters – television series (1982)
Return to Eden – television series (1986)
A Country Practice – television series (1991)
Play School – Australian television series (1968–99)
Play School – UK television series (1972–88)

Awards

Tamworth Songwriters Awards
The Tamworth Songwriters Association (TSA) is an annual songwriting contest for original country songs, awarded in January at the Tamworth Country Music Festival. They commenced in 1986. Don Spencer won one award in that time.
 (wins only)
|-
| 1995
| "Pete the Lorikeet" by Don Spencer 
| Children's Song of the Year
| 
|-

Bibliography
Books written or co-written by Don Spencer:

References

External links

1941 births
Australian children's musicians
Living people
Recipients of the Medal of the Order of Australia
Australian guitarists
Australian singer-songwriters
Australian expatriates in Canada
Australian expatriates in the United Kingdom
Australian male actors
People from Tamworth, New South Wales
Musicians from Sydney
Australian children's television presenters
Acoustic guitarists
BBC television presenters
Australian male guitarists
Australian male singer-songwriters